Sastavci is a village in the Serbian municipality of Priboj, in Zlatibor District. It lies immediately east of the village of Međurečje, which is an exclave of Bosnia and Herzegovina. There are no border controls in or around the village.

External links
Information and a map of the village

Bosnia and Herzegovina–Serbia border crossings